The Democratic Union Coalition was a coalition of political parties in Mongolia. Its primary constituents were the Mongolian National Democratic Party and the Mongolian Social Democratic Party, and its core policies were the implementation of political and economic reforms in the post-communist period. Its chairman was Tsakhiagiin Elbegdorj in 1996-2000. The coalition later became the foundation of the current Democratic Party of Mongolia.

In the 1996 Mongolian legislative elections, the Democratic Union was victorious, defeating the ex-communist Mongolian People's Revolutionary Party. This was for the first time from 1921 that the People's Revolutionary Party had not been in power. Mendsaikhany Enkhsaikhan, manager of the elections campaign of the Democratic Union, became Prime Minister in 1996 and Tsakhiagiin Elbegdorj, leader of the Democratic Union, became Prime Minister of Mongolia in 1998.

The Democratic Union had effectively split up by the time of the 2000 legislative elections, which the Mongolian People's Revolutionary Party won.

References

Political party alliances in Mongolia